Japhug is a Gyalrong language spoken in Barkam County, Rngaba, Sichuan, China, in the three townships of Gdong-brgyad (Japhug ), Gsar-rdzong (Japhug ) and Da-tshang (Japhug ).

Phonology

Japhug is the only toneless Gyalrong language. It has 49 consonants and seven vowels.

Consonants 

The phoneme /w/ has the allophones [β] and [f].

The phoneme  is realized as an epiglottal fricative in the coda or preceding another consonant.

The prenasalized consonants are analyzed as units for two reasons. First, there is a phoneme /ɴɢ/, as in /ɴɢoɕna/ "large spider", but neither /ɴ/ nor /ɢ/ exist as independent phonemes. Second, there are clusters of fricatives and prenasalized voiced stops, as in /ʑmbri/ "willow", but never clusters of fricatives and prenasalized voiceless stops.

Japhug distinguishes between palatal plosives and velar plosive + j sequences, as in /co/ "valley" vs. /kjo/ "drag". These both contrast with alveolo-palatal affricates.

There are at least 339 consonant clusters in Japhug (Jacques 2008:29), more than in Old Tibetan or in most Indo-European languages. Some of these clusters are typologically unusual: in addition to the previously mentioned clusters of fricatives and prenasalized stops, there are clusters where the first element as a semivowel, as in /jla/ "hybrid of a yak and a cow".

Vowels 
The vowel  is attested in only one native word ( "fish") and its derivatives, but appears in Chinese loanwords.

Grammar 
Jacques (2008) is a short grammar and Jacques and Chen (2010) a text collection with interlinear glosses. Other studies on morphosyntax include Jacques (2010) on Direct–inverse marking, Jacques (2012a) on valency (passive, antipassive, anticausative, lability etc.), Jacques (2012b) on incorporation and Jacques (2013) on associated motion.

References 

 
  
  
  
 
 
 
 
 
 
 
 
 
 
 
 
 
 
 

Qiangic languages
Languages of China